The 1980 Italy rugby union tour of the United States, New Zealand and the South Pacific was a series of matches played from 11 June—8 July 1980 in the United States, South Pacific Islands and New Zealand by the Italian rugby union team.

It was the first Italian team tour to New Zealand and followed 7 years after the tour in South Africa in 1973.

Italy lost six matches and won three.

Results 

Scores and results list Italy's points tally first.

Bibliography 
  Valerio Vecchiarelli, Francesco Volpe, 2000, Italia in meta, GS editore, 2000.

Notes 

Italy
tour
tour
Italy national rugby union team tours
Rugby union tours of New Zealand
Rugby union tours of Fiji
Rugby union tours of the United States
Rugby

it:Tour della Nazionale di rugby a 15 dell'Italia 1980